Rough fuzzy hybridization is a method of hybrid intelligent system or soft computing, where Fuzzy set theory is used for linguistic representation of patterns, leading to a fuzzy granulation of the feature space. Rough set theory is used to obtain dependency rules which model informative regions in the granulated feature space.

External links
 Case generation
 A textbook

Fuzzy logic